Warren Kaeding is a Canadian politician, who was elected to the Legislative Assembly of Saskatchewan in the 2016 provincial election. He represents the electoral district of Melville-Saltcoats as a member of the Saskatchewan Party.

Kaeding received his Bachelor of Science in Agriculture from the University of Saskatchewan College of Agriculture and Bioresources in 1985. From 1986 to 2011 he was the owner/operator of Wagon Wheel Seed Corp. Kaeding and his wife Carla were awarded the title of National Outstanding Young Farmers in 1999.

Kaeding was the Legislative Secretary to the Minister of Agriculture (Irrigation Expansion), as well as a Legislative Secretary to the Minister responsible for SaskTel (Cellular Coverage and Internet Coverage).

He has served as a member of the Legislature's Standing Committee on Crowns and Central Agencies, the Crown Investments Corporation Board and Public Accounts Committee, the Standing Committee on the Economy and the Legislation and Regulation Review Committee.

On February 2, 2018, Kaeding was appointed Minister of Government Relations and Minister of First Nations, Metis and Northern Affairs.

References

Living people
Members of the Executive Council of Saskatchewan
People from Melville, Saskatchewan
Saskatchewan Party MLAs
21st-century Canadian politicians
Year of birth missing (living people)